The men's team sabre was one of seven fencing events on the fencing at the 1956 Summer Olympics programme. It was the tenth appearance of the event. The competition was held on 3 December 1956. 43 fencers from 8 nations competed.

Competition format
The competition used a pool play format, with each team facing the other teams in the pool in a round robin. Each match consisted of 16 bouts, with 4 fencers on one team facing each of the 4 fencers on the other team. Bouts were to 5 touches. Total touches against were the tie-breaker if a match was tied 8 bouts to 8. However, only as much fencing was done as was necessary to determine advancement, so some matches never occurred and some matches were stopped before the full 16 bouts were fenced if the teams advancing from the pool could be determined.

Rosters

Australia
 Leslie Fadgyas
 Alexander Martonffy
 Emeric Santo
 Leslie Kovacs
 Sandor Szoke

France
 Claude Gamot
 Jacques Lefèvre
 Bernard Morel
 Jacques Roulot

Great Britain
 Olgierd Porebski
 Bill Hoskyns
 Ralph Cooperman
 Allan Jay
 Raymond Paul

Hungary
 Aladár Gerevich
 Rudolf Kárpáti
 Pál Kovács
 Attila Keresztes
 Jenő Hámori
 Dániel Magay

Italy
 Roberto Ferrari
 Domenico Pace
 Mario Ravagnan
 Giuseppe Comini
 Luigi Narduzzi
 Gastone Darè

Poland
 Jerzy Pawłowski
 Wojciech Zabłocki
 Marian Kuszewski
 Ryszard Zub
 Andrzej Piątkowski
 Zygmunt Pawlas

Soviet Union
 Lev Kuznetsov
 Yakov Rylsky
 Yevhen Cherepovsky
 David Tyshler
 Leonid Bogdanov

United States
 Tibor Nyilas
 George Worth
 Abram Cohen
 Rex Dyer
 Allan Kwartler
 Norman Cohn-Armitage

Results

Round 1

The top two nations in each pool advanced to the semifinal.

Pool 1

Colombia had entered, but did not appear. This left Hungary and the United States to advance without competition.

Pool 2

Poland defeated Great Britain 12–4. Italy defeated Great Britain on touches against (62–66) after each team won 8 bouts in their match. No match between Poland and Italy was necessary.

Pool 3

The Soviet Union defeated Australia 14–2. When France took a 9–4 lead over Australia to clinch the match, the competition ended as Australia was certain to be the third-place team and eliminated.

Semifinals

The top two nations in each pool advanced to the final.

Semifinal 1

France defeated the Soviet Union 9–7 and the Soviet Union defeated Italy 9–7. Italy needed to beat France by that same score, then, to avoid elimination; when France took an 8–6 lead, that became impossible and Italy was set at 3rd place in the pool.

Semifinal 2

Poland defeated the United States 10–6. Hungary defeated the United States 9–1, with the remainder of the bouts between the two not necessary. No match between Poland and Hungary was necessary.

Final

The first two pairings saw Poland defeat the Soviet Union (9–7) and Hungary beat France (12–4). Poland and Hungary each won again in the second pairings, this time Poland over France (10–6) and Hungary against the Soviet Union (9–7). With two 2–0 teams and two 0–2 teams, the third set of pairings in the round-robin were effectively a gold medal match and a bronze medal match. The Soviet Union defeated France 8–7 (touches were 53–60, so even a 5–0 win for France in the final unplayed bout would have left the Soviet team the winners) to take the bronze medal, while Hungary prevailed over Poland 9–4 for the gold.

References

Fencing at the 1956 Summer Olympics
Men's events at the 1956 Summer Olympics